The 2012 African U-17 Women's World Cup Qualifying Tournament was the 3rd edition of the African U-17 Women's World Cup Qualifying Tournament, the biennial international youth football competition organised by the Confederation of African Football (CAF) to determine which women's under-17 national teams from Africa qualify for the FIFA U-17 Women's World Cup.

The tournament was  played on a home and away knockout basis. 13 teams entered the competition but due to withdrawals only 11 actually played matches.
The top three teams of the tournament Gambia, Ghana and Nigeria qualified for the 2012 FIFA U-17 Women's World Cup in Azerbaijan as the CAF representatives.

Preliminary round
The preliminary round first leg was scheduled to be played on 26 November 2011 in Nairobi, Kenya.

|}
1 Mozambique withdrew from competition before the start of the 1st leg. As a result, Kenya qualified for the next round.

First round
The first round was be held on 20–22 January 2012 (first leg) and 3–5 February 2012 (second leg).

|}
1 Guinea withdrew from competition before the start of the 1st leg. As a result, Tunisia qualified for the next round.

Second round
The second round was held on 8 and 24 March 2012. The legs of Gambia and Tunisia were played a week later. The three winning teams qualified to the 2012 FIFA U-17 Women's World Cup.

|}

Nigeria and Ghana qualified for their third time. Gambia's qualification is a first.

Qualified teams for FIFA U-17 Women's World Cup
The following three teams from CAF qualified for the FIFA U-17 Women's World Cup.

References

External links
African Women U-17 Qualifying Tournament 2012 - rsssf.com

African U-17 Cup of Nations for Women
CAF
wom
2012 in youth association football